John Bernard McDowell (July 17, 1921 – February 25, 2010) was an American prelate of the Roman Catholic Church who served as Auxiliary bishop of the Diocese of Pittsburgh in Pennsylvania from 1966 to 1996.

Biography
McDowell was ordained to the priesthood on November 4, 1945.

On July 19, 1966, McDowell was appointed as auxiliary bishop of Pittsburgh and titular bishop of Tamazuca. He was consecrated by Cardinal John Joseph Wright on September 8, 1966.

Auxiliary Bishop McDowell ordained the future Cardinal Archbishop of Boston, Seán Patrick O'Malley, O.F.M. Cap., to the priesthood on August 29, 1970.

McDowell retired on September 9, 1996.

References

People from Pennsylvania
20th-century American Roman Catholic titular bishops
1921 births
2010 deaths